Joel Jonathan Nouble (born 19 January 1996) is an English footballer who plays as a forward for Livingston.

Career
Nouble started his career in the Youth systems at Chelsea and Millwall before being offered a scholarship by Dagenham & Redbridge in November 2011 and joined the club's academy programme in June 2012. In the summer of 2013 he featured in two pre-season friendlies for the first team before joining Isthmian League Division One North side Thurrock on work experience in August. He scored on his debut with the equaliser in the 3–1 defeat to AFC Sudbury. Two weeks later he scored the first in the 5–1 win over Harlow Town. His final goal of the loan spell came in a 3–0 win over Felixstowe & Walton United in the FA Cup. Nouble returned to the Daggers in September having made eleven appearances scoring three goals.

In November 2013, he joined Isthmian League Premier Division side Grays Athletic on loan. He made his debut for the club in the victory over Tilbury in the Isthmian League Cup, coming on as a substitute for Jeff Hammond and scoring with only his second touch. His first goal in the league came in a 3–2 defeat to Dulwich Hamlet. He scored in the 3–3 draw with Chatham Town as Grays progressed through to the semi-finals of the Isthmian League Cup on penalties. He scored his first ever brace in the 4–2 home league win over Lewes. He scored his first penalty in the 2–1 away win at AFC Hornchurch. He went on to score in the 2–2 draw with Harrow Borough. He scored the equaliser in the 1–1 draw away at Lowestoft Town with a penalty. His final goal of his loan spell came in April 2014, a 3–2 away win over Hendon. He returned to the Daggers later that month having made thirty-two appearances, scoring nine goals.

In April 2014, Nouble was offered his first professional contract with Dagenham, signing a one-year contract. He made his debut for the Daggers in May 2014, coming on as a substitute for Blair Turgott in the 3–2 away win over Cheltenham Town. He was also later voted the Dagenham & Redbridge Academy Player of the Year award for the 2013–14 season. In August 2014, he joined Conference Premier side Welling United on a one-month loan, having found it difficult to break into the first team despite featuring in pre-season friendlies. He made his debut for the club in a 1–1 draw with Woking, replacing Afolabi Obafemi as a substitute. In September 2014, his loan was extended with the club for a further month. He was recalled from his loan by Dagenham in November 2014, having made thirteen appearances for the club. He subsequently joined Conference South side St Albans City on an initial one-month youth loan. He scored his only goal for the club in a 3–2 home defeat to Farnborough. He returned to Dagenham in December 2014, having made seven appearances in all competitions for the club. Later in the month he returned on loan to former side Thurrock of the Isthmian League Division One North for an initial one month. He made his second debut for the club against Heybridge Swifts in a 1–0 defeat. He scored in the 3–0 away win over Cray Wanderers with a delicate chip, in which turned out to be his final game of the loan spell, having made three appearances. In January 2015, he moved out on loan again to former club Grays Athletic of the Isthmian League Premier Division on a one-month youth loan. Nouble was released by Dagenham at the end of the 2014–15 season.

In July 2016, he joined National League South side Bishop's Stortford on a free transfer having suffered over a year with injuries since his release from Dagenham. Later that season he re-joined Grays Athletic. Nouble spent the 2017-18 season with Thurrock, leaving the club at the end of the season when they folded, before initially joining Tonbridge Angels in May 2018. However, the move was called off before the start of the coming season due to his personal circumstances. Nouble instead signed for Haringey Borough, and after 18 goals in the 2018-19 season, move up a division to join Concord Rangers the following summer. In July 2020 he progressed up a level again to join Aldershot Town.

In July 2021, Nouble signed for Livingston on a two-year deal with an option for a third. He then immediately joined Arbroath on a season-long loan. Nouble was recalled from loan in the January 2022 transfer window.

International career
Nouble made his international debut for Cascadia at the 2018 ConIFA World Football Cup, as a late replacement for Lorne Jenkins. He scored twice on his debut against Tamil Eelam, in a 6–0 victory that guaranteed the team's passage to the quarter finals.

Personal life
Nouble was born in Deptford, London Borough of Lewisham to Ivorian parents. 

He is the younger brother of former England youth international and Colchester United footballer, Frank Nouble.

Career statistics

References

External links

Living people
1996 births
English footballers
Footballers from Deptford
English people of Ivorian descent
Black British sportspeople
Dagenham & Redbridge F.C. players
Grays Athletic F.C. players
Thurrock F.C. players
Welling United F.C. players
St Albans City F.C. players
Bishop's Stortford F.C. players
Haringey Borough F.C. players
Concord Rangers F.C. players
Aldershot Town F.C. players
Livingston F.C. players
Arbroath F.C. players
English Football League players
National League (English football) players
Isthmian League players
Association football forwards
Scottish Professional Football League players